Shatenevo is a rural locality (a village) in Gorodetskoye Rural Settlement, Kichmengsko-Gorodetsky District, Vologda Oblast, Russia. The population was 243 as of 2002. There are 7 streets.

Geography 
Shatenevo is located 25 km southwest of Kichmengsky Gorodok (the district's administrative centre) by road. Bolshoye Khavino is the nearest rural locality.

References 

Rural localities in Kichmengsko-Gorodetsky District